Montréjeau is a commune in the Haute-Garonne department in southwestern France. Montréjeau-Gourdan-Polignan station has rail connections to Toulouse, Pau, Bayonne and Tarbes.

History
Montréjeau was the site of one of the French Revolution's last pitched battles between republicans and royalists. In the summer of 1799, anti-revolutionary insurrection broke out in the Haute-Garonne. For a brief time it flourished, even threatening the city of Toulouse. The Directory reacted swiftly, ordering in troops which decisively defeated the rebels at Montréjeau on 1 Fructidor Year VII (18 August 1799).

Population

See also
Communes of the Haute-Garonne department

References

Communes of Haute-Garonne
Haute-Garonne communes articles needing translation from French Wikipedia